Eber Donn or Emer Don may refer to:

Éber Donn mac Míled, a son of Míl Espáine
Éber Donn mac Ír, a grandson of Míl Espáine

See also
Eber Finn
Érimón